Samo Kuščer (born 1952) is a Slovene physicist and writer.

He won the Levstik Award twice for his popular science books, in 1987  Logo in računalnik (Logo and Computers) and in 1993 for Energija (Energy). He is also known for his science fiction stories.

Selected works 
Zrak (Air), 2000
Voda (Water), 1997
Brbi gre po barve (Brbi Gets Some Colours), 1994
Živa zemlja (Living Earth), 1994
Energija (Energy), 1991
Logo in računalnik (Logo and Computers), 1987
Moj prijatelj računalnik (My Friend the Computer), 1985
Sabi" (Sabi), short SF stories, 1983Žalostni virtuoz'' (Melancholy Virtuoso), short SF stories, 1989

References

1952 births
Slovenian writers
Slovenian science fiction writers
Yugoslav science fiction writers
Slovenian physicists
Levstik Award laureates
Living people